Mohkhuti No.2 is a village located in the Majuli district, in the northeastern state of Assam, India.

References

Villages in Majuli district